Egyptian Handball Cup is an annual cup competition for Egypt handball teams. Organized by the Egyptian Handball Federation, it was originally known as the Egyptian Handball Cup. It was the second nationwide handball competition played in Egypt, with the first competition in 1979.

Winners by year
 The complete list of the Egyptian cup winners since 1979:

Titles by club

See also
Egyptian Handball League

References

Handball competitions in Egypt
Recurring sporting events established in 1979